Goodenia willisiana, commonly known as sandhill goodenia, is a species of flowering plant in the family Goodeniaceae and is endemic to drier areas of south-eastern Australia. It is an erect or ascending perennial herb with crowded elliptic to lance-shaped leaves at the base of the plant, and yellow flowers arranged singly in leaf axils.

Description

Taxonomy and naming
Goodenia willisiana was first formally described in 1990 by Roger Charles Carolin in the journal Telopea from material collected by James Hamlyn Willis near Redcliffs in 1937. The specific epithet (willisiana) honours J.H. Willis.

Distribution and habitat
This goodenia grows in western New South Wales, north-western Victoria and south-eastern South Australia, often on sandhills and in mallee communities.

References

willisiana
Flora of South Australia
Flora of New South Wales
Flora of Victoria (Australia)
Plants described in 1990
Taxa named by Roger Charles Carolin
Endemic flora of Australia